The Avon by-election was held in 1887 to elect a member for the Avon electorate to the New Zealand House of Representatives, during the 9th session of Parliament. The election was held on 1 June 1887, less than four months before the next general election. Edwin Blake won the election against William Dunlop, with a majority of 3.

Turnout was particularly low; in the previous election (which Dunlop lost by a greater margin) 731 valid votes (69%) were cast in an electorate of 1,065 voters, while in the following election (held by Blake) 1,428 valid votes (72%) were cast in an electorate of 1,990 voters.

References

Avon 1887
1887 elections in New Zealand